Dowlatabad (also Romanized as Dowlatābād; also known as Daulatābād) is a village in Kamin Rural District, in the Central District of Pasargad County, Fars Province, Iran. At the 2006 census, its population was 465, in 123 families.

References 

Populated places in Pasargad County